The Germanic Review: Literature, Culture, Theory is a quarterly peer-reviewed academic journal published by Routledge covering German studies, including German literature and culture, as well as German authors, intellectuals, and artists. The editor-in-chief is Oliver Simons (Columbia University). The journal was established in 1926 by Robert Herndon Fife (Columbia University) and originally published by the Columbia University Press. Later it was published by Heldref Publishers until that company was acquired by Taylor & Francis in 2009, which published the journal under its Routledge imprint.

Editors-in-chief
The following persons are or have been editor-in-chief:

Abstracting and indexing
The journal is abstracted and indexed in:

References

External links

Area studies journals
Quarterly journals
Publications established in 1926
Multilingual journals
Routledge academic journals